The Fig Leaves Are Falling is a musical with a book and lyrics by Allan Sherman and music by Albert Hague. It was inspired by Sherman's 1966 divorce following 21 years of marriage.

Production 
The musical opened on Broadway at the Broadhurst Theatre on January 2, 1969 and closed on January 6 after four performances and 17 previews. Directed by George Abbott and choreographed by Eddie Gasper, the scenic design was by William and Jean Eckart, costume design was by Robert Mackintosh, and lighting design was by Tharon Musser.

The cast included Dorothy Loudon as Lillian Stone, Barry Nelson as Harry Stone, Kenneth Kimmins, Jenny O'Hara, Helon Blount, and David Cassidy (his Broadway debut). Loudon won the Drama Desk Award for Outstanding Performance and was nominated for the Tony Award for Best Actress in a Musical.

A revised version by Ben West, who also directed, was presented by the UnsungMusicalsCo. in January 2013 at the Off-Off-Broadway Connelly Theater.

Background
The first director, Jack Klugman, left the production prior to rehearsals, and George Abbott was then hired as director. The cast included Jules Munshin, who left during the out of town tryout in Philadelphia. Ben West noted that during the tryout period "substantial structural changes persisted, with multiple musical numbers being assigned to different characters while others were eliminated altogether..."

Songs

Act I      
All Is Well in Larchmont
Lillian
Like Yours
All of My Laughter
Give Me a Cause
Today I Saw a Rose
We    
For Our Sake
Light One Candle
Oh, Boy

Act II      
The Fig Leaves Are Falling
For the Rest of My Life
I Like It
Broken Heart
Old Fashioned Song
Lillian, Lillian, Lillian
Did I Ever Really Live
All of My Laughter

Critical response
Clive Barnes in his review for The New York Times, wrote: "There is nothing much wrong ...that a new book, new music, new lyrics, new settings, new direction, new choreography and a partially new cast would not quite possibly put right."

Daniel M. Gold, reviewing the 2013 production for The New York Times, wrote: "...in the end the songs and their chronicle of temptation disappoint. There is little of the snap or crackle of Sherman’s best lyrics, and Hague’s music is forgettable."

References

External links
 
 New York Public Library Blog on The Fig Leaves are Falling

1969 musicals
Broadway musicals